Michael Essany (born October 22, 1982, in Valparaiso, Indiana) is an American comedian and talk show host.

Essany hosted The Michael Essany Show on local, national and international television for seven years.  He has also written a column for The Times of Northwest Indiana, published multiple books, and twice run for public office. He is a 2005 graduate of Valparaiso University.

Essany hosted three episodes of The Goodnight Show with Michael Essany in August 2017.

References

External links
 

1982 births
Living people
American columnists
American male comedians
21st-century American comedians
People from Valparaiso, Indiana
American television talk show hosts
Valparaiso University alumni